The Video Collection can refer to:

The Video Collection (Anastacia video), 2002
The Video Collection (Anna Vissi video), 2001
The Video Collection (Cher video), 1993
The Video Collection (Sara Evans video), 2006
The Video Collection (Katy Garbi video), 2003
The Video Collection 93:99, a 1999 release by Madonna
The Video Collection: 1997–2003, a 2003 release by HIM
Video Collection (1984–1992), a 1996 release by Skinny Puppy
Bowie – The Video Collection, a 1993 release by David Bowie
Video Collection, a 2003 release by Good Charlotte
The Video Collection, a brand of video home entertainment by Video Collection International